Zavaljus is a genus of beetles belonging to the family Erotylidae.

The species of this genus are found in Northern Europe.

Species:
 Zavaljus brunneus (Gyllenhal, 1808)

References

Erotylidae